Lytoceratidae is a taxonomic family of ammonoid cephalopods belonging to the suborder Lytoceratina, characterized by  very evolute shells that generally enlarge rapidly, having whorls in contact but mostly overlapping very sightly, or not at all.

Surface ornament may consist of various combinations of straight or crinkled growth lines, flares, constrictions, and, more rarely, plications. Sutures are highly complex and moss-like, but with few major elements. Lateral lobes are widely splayed and blunt, or with obliquely deflected end. The external, ventral, lobe is short.

The Lytoceratinae have a worldwide distribution and a stratigraphic range extending from the middle Lower Jurassic (Pliensbachian) to the early Upper Cretaceous (Cenomanian).

Subfamilies
The Lytoceratidae has been divided into four subfamilies, as follows.

 Lytoceratinae Neumayr 1875 (Pliensbachian) 
 Ammonoceratites Bowditch 1822
 Argonauticeras Anderson 1938
 Carinolytoceras Wiedmann 1962
 Eulytoceras Spath 1927
 Hemilytoceras Spath 1927
 Lytoceras Suess 1865
 Metalytoceras Spath 1927
 Pictetia Uhlig 1883
 Protetragonites Hyatt 1900
 Pterolytoceras Spath 1927
Lytoceratids with whorls that bear growth lines or lamellar flares, or both, and in which there are only two lateral lobes in the external suture, on either side, and the dorsal lobe is cruciform (cross like).

 Megalytoceratinae (Toarcian – Bajocian)
Planulate lytoceratids in which whorls and sutures tend to lose lytoceratid character and resemble those of the perisphinctidae.

 Villaniinae  (Callovian)
Plantulate lytoceratids with sutures like those in the Lytoceratinae, but without the dorsal lobe being cruciform.

 Alocolytoceratinae Spath 1927 (Toarcian – Bajocian) 
 Alocolytoceras
 Audaxlytoceras
 Derolytoceras
 Lobolytoceras
 Pachylytoceras
 Pleurolytoceras

Lytoceratids with many deep constrictions resulting and capricorns in middle whorls. Outer whorls become more smooth and involute. Capricorn: a shell encircled by blunt, wide spaced ribs separated by subequal rounded interspaces, resembling a goat's horn .

References

 
Ammonitida families
Jurassic ammonites
Pliensbachian first appearances
Cenomanian extinctions